William Gerald Charles Cadogan, 7th Earl Cadogan, MC, DL (13 February 1914 – 4 July 1997) was a British peer and professional soldier.

Early life
Born on 13 February 1914, he was the eldest son of Gerald Cadogan, 6th Earl Cadogan and his wife Lilian Cadogan. He was educated at Eton College, an all-boys public boarding school in Eton, Berkshire.

He inherited his titles on the death of his father on 4 October 1933, his family seat at Culford Park was sold in 1935 and became Culford School.

Military service
Cadogan joined the Army and rose to the rank of captain in the Coldstream Guards, seeing action in World War II. On 4 February 1943, as a lieutenant (temporary captain), he was awarded the Military Cross (MC) "in recognition of gallant and distinguished services in the Middle East".

On 1 May 1947, he transferred from the Reserve of Officers to the Royal Wiltshire Yeomanry, a Territorial Army unit of the Royal Armoured Corps and was promoted to lieutenant colonel. He relinquished his commission on 1 May 1948 and was granted the honorary rank of lieutenant colonel.

Later life
Cadogan held the office of Deputy Lieutenant (DL) of the County of London in 1958 and was Mayor of Chelsea in 1964.

On his death in 1997 his titles passed to his son Charles Gerald John Cadogan, 8th Earl Cadogan.

Personal life
Cadogan married twice; firstly, on 11 June 1936 Primrose Lilian Yarde-Buller, daughter of John Reginald Lopes Yarde-Buller, 3rd Baron Churston of Churston Ferrers and Lupton and secondly Cecilia Margaret Hamilton-Wedderburn (10 March 1916 – 31 March 1999), daughter of Lt-Col. Henry Kellerman Hamilton-Wedderburn, on 13 January 1961. With his first wife he had four children, the eldest son of whom was his heir Charles Gerald John Cadogan, 8th Earl Cadogan.

He was a Freemason and served as the Pro Grand Master of the United Grand Lodge of England from 1969 until 1982.

References

External links
 www.thepeerage.com

External links

Cadogan, William Charles, 7th Earl
Cadogan, William Charles, 7th Earl
Cadogan, William Charles, 7th Earl
Cadogan, William Charles, 7th Earl
People educated at Eton College
W
Members of Chelsea Metropolitan Borough Council
Mayors of places in Greater London
Coldstream Guards officers
Royal Wiltshire Yeomanry officers
British Army personnel of World War II
Recipients of the Military Cross
Freemasons of the United Grand Lodge of England